is a Japanese talent agency formed by Johnny Kitagawa in 1962, which manages groups of male idols known as .

History

1962–1989
In 1962, Kitagawa launched his first group, Johnnys. In its early days, Kitagawa's agency rented an office space owned by Watanabe Productions, operating under its management as well. Six years later, Four Leaves, a boy band created by the agency, became successful. Four Leaves left a lasting legacy to the industry because it was produced as a "Group sounds band that does not play instruments", a product of Kitagawa's taste for emphasizing the attributes, personality and physical abilities of a performer. Since then Kitagawa has formed a number of successful acts, such as solo artist Masahiko Kondō, whose song, won the 1987 Japan Record Award, and Hikaru Genji, the first Johnny group with three singles on the Japanese Oricon yearly chart in 1988.

Johnny & Associates played an integral role in the post-war growth of Japanese boy bands and the idol industry. While there were idols since the 1970s who were able to sing and dance at the same time, the agency popularized the idea of performance-oriented idols in the 1980s.  Kitagawa himself was credited with pioneering the idol system where trainees (known as Johnny Jr.) are admitted into the agency at a young age to train in singing, dancing, and acting until their debut.

1990–2009
Around the 1990s, Johnny & Associates' marketing strategy changed to include variety show hosting as a specialty in their talents. At the time, the agency focused on marketing the singing and dancing talents of their acts until they would retire around age 25 as they aged out of the industry. Taking note of former Shibugakitai member Hirohide Yakumaru's success as an MC on Hanamaru, Johnny & Associates subsequently trained their more recent groups to have public personas as well.

During the 1990s Johnny & Associates began declining nominations from the Japan Record Awards and the Japan Academy Awards, partly due to a dispute about the musical genre of one of their groups at the 32nd Japan Record Awards. Another reason cited was that the nominations would engender competition among Johnny groups and with other nominees.

In 1997 the agency founded a record label, Johnny's Entertainment. Also, a New Year's Eve countdown concert is held live on Fuji TV from the Tokyo Dome since 1996 known as Johnny's Countdown Live with a different theme each year.

In 2006, Oricon sued journalist Hiro Ugaya when he was quoted in a Cyzo magazine article suggesting that the company manipulated its statistics to benefit certain management companies and labels (specifically, Johnny & Associates). Ugaya condemned the action as a strategic lawsuit against public participation, and it was later dropped by Oricon with no charges filed against the journalist.

In 2007, temporary Johnny's Jr. group, Hey! Say! 7, broke a record as the youngest male group to ever top Oricon charts, with an average age of 14.8 years. Later that year, Hey! Say! JUMP broke a record as the largest group to debut in Johnny's history, with ten members. By 2008, Johnny & Associates was known as the "top 3" recording artist companies.

2010–present

On November 19, 2010, Masahiko Kondo received the Best Vocal Performance award at the 52nd Japan Record Awards; Kondo was the first Johnny recipient since Ninja refused to perform live at the 1990 awards.

On September 18, 2011, Kitagawa received Guinness World Record awards for the most number-one singles (232) and the most concerts (8,419 from 1974 to 2010) produced by an individual. His shows have been attended by an estimated 48,234,550 people.

In 2018, Johnny & Associates, especially Kitagawa, who had been previously known for strictly controlling access to their acts, established a YouTube channel for their trainee groups, Johnny's Jr. In January 2019, Hideaki Takizawa was named the president of a new subdivision of the company called Johnny's Island, where he would manage and oversee the debut of trainee group Snow Man. After Kitagawa's death on July 9, 2019, his niece, Julie Keiko Fujishima was made the new president of the agency, while Takizawa and Suguru Shirahase became the vice presidents and Kitagawa's older sister, Mary Yasuko Fujishima, became the executive director. After that, Johnny & Associates made their discography available on streaming platforms and opened social media accounts. On November 1, 2022, Takizawa resigned from his position as vice president and departed from Johnny & Associates. Yoshihiko Inohara, a former member of V6, replaced Takizawa as vice president.

Charity activities
In 1998, Johnny's groups KinKi Kids, V6 and Tokio, formed a special charity-oriented group called J-Friends, to raise funds for the 1995 Hanshin and Awaji earthquake victims. The group continued with several activities, until their disbandment in 2003.

The agency continued its fundraising project, now with Marching J, for the Tōhoku earthquake victims in 2011. Its first event was held on April 1–3. Hey! Say! JUMP, SMAP, Tokio, KinKi Kids, V6, Arashi, Tackey and Tsubasa, NEWS, Kanjani8, KAT-TUN  and Johnny's Juniors participated in the fundraiser, which included talk sessions and a cappella performances. The agency planned to hold one fundraiser per month for a year. The next event, a baseball tournament featuring Johnny's Jrs., was held on May 29. After the 2011 Tōhoku earthquake and tsunami, Johnny & Associates cancelled or postponed 18 concerts, including shows by Tomohisa Yamashita and Tackey & Tsubasa.

Charity activities continued as Johnny's "Smile Up! Project". On May 13, 2020, it was reported that 76 of Johnny's artists from 15 groups, including V6, Arashi, News and others, would be included in the temporary unit "Twenty Twenty", as part of Johnny's charity project with support activity to prevent the spread of COVID-19. This group would sing the song "Smile", written by Mr. Children's Kazutoshi Sakurai, which was released as a single in digital form on June 22, and on CD on August 12. Yuya Tegoshi was taken off the grouping, due to reports of his failing to keep orders to stay at home during the emergency situation in April. Later on, it was revealed that his contract had been terminated, and that he had left the company. Activities continued on the end-of-year period with a new awareness campaign against COVID-19 and the Flu, starting on November 24. "Aitsu", the new project, revolves around a series of movies continuing the health measure awareness used from the beginning of the pandemic, like the correct form of washing hands, the continuous use of a mask, among others. The movies would be distributed around Japan and also be included in the Smile Up! Project's social network accounts.

Views and controversies

Accessibility to talents
The business model of Johnny & Associates has an agency at the center in most areas in which it operates; the company has had its own recording, publishing, producing, filmmaking, merchandising, and advertising arms, a vertical integration that parallels Japanese  system, and for most of its history transmitted information directly to fans exclusively through the Family Club, a tightly controlled, membership-based platform on which its artists and their fans can communicate and share information with each other. During the 20th century, the F.C. was largely maintained through mail and fax.

Johnny & Associates exercises strict control over their talents' likeness, to the point where photographs were initially not even posted on the company's official website and silhouettes were used in place of actual imagery on official websites of films and television in which the talent appeared. In addition to this, Johnny & Associates until recently did not use social media, limiting digital contents to paid subscription services like Johnny's Web. In 2011, Johnny & Associates began posting photos of their talents on their official website. On January 31, 2018, Johnny & Associates lifted their photo ban completely and allowed the press to post approved images of their talents more freely. In March of the same year, Johnny & Associates launched a YouTube channel for selected Johnny's Jr. groups. Since Kitagawa's death in 2019, Johnny & Associates have expanded accessibility for their talents.

Sexual harassment allegations

In 1988, former Four Leaves member Koji Kita alleged in his book Dear Hikaru Genji that he had been propositioned by Kitagawa and that Kitagawa operated a casting couch. In 1996, former Johnny Jr.'s member Junya Hiramoto alleged in his book All About Johnnys that Kitagawa shared the boys' communal dormitory and insisted on washing their backs at bath time. In 2001, Shukan Bunshun ran a series of similar sexual harassment allegations along with claims that Kitagawa had allegedly forced the boys to drink alcohol and smoke. Johnny & Associates sued Shukan Bunshun for defamation, and in 2002, the Tokyo District Court ruled in favor of Kitagawa, awarding him  in damages. Kitagawa filed an appeal to the Supreme Court of Japan, but it was rejected in 2004. The case saw minimal coverage in Japan, with many journalists attributing it to Kitagawa's influence on Japanese mass media.

On March 7, 2023, BBC released a documentary centered on the sexual harassment claims against Kitagawa titled Predator: The Secret Scandal of J-Pop. In response, Johnny & Associates released a statement stating that they were working on creating "transparent organizational structures" that will be announced later in the year.

Media blacklisting investigation
For years, Johnny & Associates has been suspected of having connections with the mass media to produce extensive and favorable coverage on the company, its acts, and Kitagawa, while reducing coverage on anything perceived to be a threat to their image and sales. An example noted by journalists mention that Kitagawa would threaten to withdraw his talents from certain music programs and channels if they provide unfavorable coverage or invite competing boy bands from other agencies. On July 18, 2019, Johnny & Associates was investigated by the Fair Trading Commission for potentially violating the Anti-Monopoly Act due to accusations of pressuring the media to reduce coverage on Atarashii Chizu, a group made up of former SMAP members Shingo Katori, Tsuyoshi Kusanagi, and Goro Inagaki. Despite lack of hard evidence, Johnny & Associates received a warning.

Current artists

Recording artists

Groups
 TOKIO
 KinKi Kids
 Arashi
 NEWS
 Kanjani Eight
 KAT-TUN
 Hey! Say! JUMP

 Kis-My-Ft2
 Sexy Zone
 A.B.C-Z
 Johnny's West
 King & Prince
 SixTones
 Snow Man
 Naniwa Danshi
 Travis Japan 

Sub-units
 Busaiku

Soloists
 Takuya Kimura
 Junichi Okada
 Ken Miyake
 Yuma Nakayama

Actors/Entertainers

Actors
 Noriyuki Higashiyama
 
 Takuya Kimura
 
 
  (until May 2, 2023)
 Junichi Okada
 Toma Ikuta
 Hiroki Uchi
 Shunsuke Kazama
 
 
 Keito Okamoto
 
 
 
 
 
 

Entertainers
 
 
 
 
 Yudai Tatsumi

Trainees
Trainees are known as Johnny's Jr. and have traditionally performed on Johnny's related variety shows and as backup dancers for the agency's groups. However, in recent years select Junior groups have taken on levels of visibility akin to mainstream senior acts, including national commercial sponsorships, solo concerts, national tours, and starring film and television roles.

Notable trainees
 HiHi Jets (ja) - formed 2015
 Bi Shonen (美 少年) - formed 2016
 7 Men Samurai - formed 2018
 Shonen Ninja (少年忍者) - formed 2018
 Jr. SP (ja) - formed 2018
 IMPACTors (ja) - formed 2020
 Go!Go!Kids (ja)- formed 2022
 Lil Kansai (Lil かんさい) - formed 2019
 Ae! group (Aぇ! group) - formed 2019
 Boys be (ja) - formed 2020
 AmBitious (ja)- formed 2021

Former artists

Former recording artists

 Johnnys (1962-1967)
 Hiromi Maie (1962–?)
 Osami Iino (1962–1968)
 Ryo Nakatani (1962–?)
 Teruhiko Aoi (1962–1967)
 Four Leaves (1968-1976)
 Kōji Kita (1966–1989)
 Takashi Aoyama (1966–1978)
 Toshio Egi (1966–?)
 Masao Orimo (1966–?)
 Eiji Nagata (1966–1977)
 Hiromi Go (1971–1975)
 Teruyoshi Aoi (1973–1976)
 Jo Toyokawa (1975–1979)
 Little Gang (1975-1976)
 Mayo Kawasaki (1976–1989)
 Masahiko Kondō (1977–2021)
 Toshihiko Tahara (1979–1994)
 Ippei Hikaru (1980–1985)
 Shibugakitai (1982-1988)
 Hirohide Yakumaru
 Toshikazu Fukawa
 Masahiro Motoki
 Shigeyuki Nakamura (1982–1993)
 The Good-Bye (1983-1990)
 Hikaru Genji (1987-1995)
 Mikio Ôsawa (1982–1994)
 Kazumi Morohoshi (1984–1994)
 Hiroyuki Satō (1983–1994)
 Junichi Yamamoto (1986–2002)
 Akira Akasaka (1987–2007)
 SMAP (1990-2016)
 Katsuyuki Mori (1987–1996)
 Goro Inagaki (1987–2016)
 Tsuyoshi Kusanagi (1987–2016)
 Shingo Katori (1988–2016)
 Masahiro Nakai (1986-2020)
 Otokogumi (1988-1993)
 Shoji Narita
 Kazuya Takahashi
 Koyo Maeda
 Ninja (1990-1997)
 TOKIO
 Hiromu Kojima (1990–1994)
 Tatsuya Yamaguchi (1989–2018)
 Tomoya Nagase (1992–2021)
 V6 (1995-2021)
 Go Morita (1995–2021)
 Coming Century (1995–2021)
 Tackey & Tsubasa (2002-2018)
 Tsubasa Imai (1995–2018)
 NEWS
 Hironori Kusano (2001–2008)
 Takahiro Moriuchi (2001–2003)
 Yuya Tegoshi (2003-2020)
 Tomohisa Yamashita (1996-2020)
 KAT-TUN
 Koki Tanaka (1998–2013)
 Jin Akanishi (1998–2014)
 Junnosuke Taguchi (1999–2016)
 Hey! Say! JUMP
 Ryutaro Morimoto (2004–2011)
 Kanjani Eight
 Ryo Nishikido (2004-2019)
 Subaru Shibutani (2004-2018)
 Tegomass (2006-2020)

Project groups

 Johnny's Junior Special (1975)
 Tanokin Trio (1980-1983)
 J-Friends (1998)
 Secret Agent (2000)
 MiMyCen (2001)
 Ya-Ya-yah (2002)
 Toraji Haiji (2005)
 Shūji to Akira (2005)
 GYM (2006)
 Kisarazu Cats Eye feat. MCU (2006)
 Trio the Shakiiin (2007)
 Hey! Say! 7 (2007)
 Matchy with Question (2008)
 The Shigotonin (2009)
 NYC boys (2009)
 Snow Prince Gasshodan (2009)
 Lands (2009)
 Marching J (2011)
 A.N. Jell (2011)
 The Monsters (2012)
 Hottake Band (2014)
 Jigoku-zu (2016)
 Kame to Yamapi (2017)
 A.Y.T (2017)

Former actors
 Nobuhiro Aoyama
 Keiichi Miyoshi (1982–1991)
 Mizuki Sano (1991–2019)

See also
 List of record labels
 Hadaka no Shōnen

Notes

References

External links

  (in Japanese)

 
J-pop
Japanese record labels
Japanese talent agencies
Record labels established in 1962
1962 establishments in Japan